Bitila Tawake (born 2 April 1999) is a Fijian rugby union player.

Biography 
Tawake hails from Mualevu, Vanua Balavu in Lau and has maternal links to Nukuloa, Gau in Lomaiviti. She attended Veiuto Primary and Yat Sen Secondary. She has represented Fiji in basketball.

Tawake was named in the Fijiana Drua squad for their first Super W competition. She captained the Drua in their debut match against the Rebels. She also led them against the Waratahs in the Grand Final as they clinched their first title.

Tawake was selected for the Fijiana squad for two test matches against Australia and Japan in May. She only featured in the Japan test.

Tawake captained the Fijiana's at the 2022 Oceania Championship in New Zealand. She led her side in their record trouncing of Papua New Guinea. She then scored a try in their 34–7 win against Tonga. She also led the Fijiana's in their final matchup against Samoa. In September she played in a warm up match against Canada. She was also named in the Fijiana squad for the 2021 Rugby World Cup.

References 

1999 births
Living people
Female rugby union players
Fijian female rugby union players
Fiji women's international rugby union players